Solnechny District is an administrative and municipal district (raion), one of the seventeen in Khabarovsk Krai, Russia. It is located in the center of the krai. Its administrative center is the urban locality (a work settlement) of Solnechny. Population:  The population of the administrative center accounts for 39.5% of the district's total population.

Tin mining
The district owes its origins to tin exploration and mining and the subsequent Solnechny Processing Complex which sourced its ore from Solnechnoye, Festivalnoye and Predorozhnoye Tin deposits. Currently, the only operating mine is the Festivalnoye mine, operated by Rusolovo. A further operation is based upon the reprocessing of the Predorozhnoye tailings. The Sable (Sobolinoye) tin deposit is currently being developed by Zabaikalskaya Gornorudnaya Kompaniya which uses an English trading name of Sable Tin Resources.

References

Notes

Sources

Districts of Khabarovsk Krai